Voljela sam oči nevjerne (I Loved Unfaithful Eyes) is the debut studio album by Bosnian folk singer Hanka Paldum. It was released 13 February 1974 through the record label Diskoton.

Track listing
Sve sam tebi dala
Voljela sam oči nevjerne (Zelene oči)
Jesen se naša vratiti neće
Vrbas
Burmu ću tvoju nositi
Od kako je Banja Luka postala
Ja te pjesmom zovem
Pokraj puta rodila jabuka
Još te volim
Živim za nas dvoje
Plakaću danas, plakaću sutra
Ne vraćaj se više

References

1974 albums
Hanka Paldum albums
Diskoton albums